An aponeurosis (plural: aponeuroses) is a type or a variant of the deep fascia, in the form of a sheet of pearly-white fibrous tissue that attaches sheet-like muscles needing a wide area of attachment. Their primary function is to join muscles and the body parts they act upon, whether bone or other muscles.  They have a shiny, whitish-silvery color, are histologically similar to tendons, and are very sparingly supplied with blood vessels and nerves. When dissected, aponeuroses are papery and peel off by sections. The primary regions with thick aponeuroses are in the ventral abdominal region, the dorsal lumbar region, the ventriculus in birds, and the palmar (palms) and plantar (soles) regions.

Anatomy

Anterior abdominal aponeuroses
The anterior abdominal aponeuroses are located just superficial to the rectus abdominis muscle. It has for its borders the external oblique, pectoralis muscles, and the latissimus dorsi.

Posterior lumbar aponeuroses
The posterior lumbar aponeuroses are situated just on top of the epaxial muscles of the thorax, which are multifidus spinae and sacrospinalis.

Palmar and plantar aponeuroses and extensor hood
The palmar aponeuroses occur on the palms of the hands. The extensor hoods are aponeuroses at the back of the fingers.
The plantar aponeuroses occur on the plantar aspect of the foot. They extend from the calcaneal tuberosity then diverge to connect to the bones, ligaments and the dermis of the skin around the distal part of the metatarsal bones.

Anterior and posterior intercostal membranes
The anterior and posterior intercostal membranes are aponeuroses located between the ribs and are continuations of the external and internal intercostal muscles, respectively.

Scalp aponeuroses
The epicranial aponeurosis, or galea aponeurotica, is a tough layer of dense fibrous tissue which runs from the frontalis muscle anteriorly to the occipitalis posteriorly.

Pennate muscles and aponeuroses
Pennate muscles, in which the muscle fibers are oriented at an angle to the line of action, typically have two aponeuroses.  Muscle fibers connect one to the other, and each aponeurosis thins into a tendon which attaches to bone at the origin or insertion site.

Function
Like tendons, aponeuroses attached to pennate muscles can be stretched by the forces of muscular contraction, absorbing energy like a spring and returning it when they recoil to unloaded conditions. Also serving as an origin or insertion site for certain muscles e.g latissimus dorsi.

See also
 Aponeurosis of the obliquus externus abdominis
 Aponeurosis of the serratus posterior superior muscle
 Plantar aponeurosis
 Inguinal aponeurotic falx
 Bicipital aponeurosis
 Palatine aponeurosis
 Fascia

References 

Tissues (biology)